The women's 500 metres races of the 2015–16 ISU Speed Skating World Cup 2, arranged in the Utah Olympic Oval, in Salt Lake City, United States, was held on November 20 and 21, 2015.

Zhang Hong of China won race one, while Brittany Bowe and Heather Richardson-Bergsma, both of the United States, came second and third. Kim Min-sun of South Korea won the first Division B race.

Zhang also won race two, while Lee Sang-hwa of South Korea came second, and Bowe came third. Nadezhda Aseyeva of Russia won the second Division B race.

Race 1
Race one took place on Friday, November 20, with Division B scheduled in the morning session, at 10:23, and Division A scheduled in the afternoon session, at 14:10.

Division A

Note: NR = national record.

Division B

Race 2
Race two took place on Saturday, November 21, with Division B scheduled at 09:00, and Division A scheduled at 15:06.

Division A

Division B

References

Women 0500
2
ISU